Ferdinand Johann Graf von Morzin (1756 in Ptenín – 27 February 1805 in Prague) was an Austrian infantry commander during the French Revolutionary Wars.

Notes

References

1756 births
1805 deaths
18th-century Austrian people
18th-century Bohemian people
Austrian Empire military leaders of the French Revolutionary Wars
Ferdinand Johann
Bohemian nobility
Austrian people of Czech descent
People from Plzeň-South District